Saint Hilarius of Aquileia, also Hilary of Aquileia (also Ellaro or Elaro) (d. 16 March, c. 284) was an early Bishop of Aquileia, a martyr and saint.

He is supposed to have been the second bishop of Aquileia, succeeding Hermagoras. During the persecution of Numerian he was tortured to death under the prefect Beronius. Before his death Hilarius's prayers brought about the collapse of the pagan temples in Aquileia and the images of the gods they contained, to which he had refused to sacrifice.

His martyrdom was shared by his deacon Tatianus, otherwise Tatian, with whom Hilarius's name is often linked, as in the dedication of Gorizia Cathedral, and also by their companions Felix, Largus and Dionysius.

The feast day of Hilarius and companions is 16 March, the date of their martyrdom.

References
 Saints SPQN: Hilary of Aquileia
 BBKL: Hilarius von Aquileia 
 www.heiligenlexikon.de: Hilarius von Aquileia 
 Santi e Beati 
 Dizionario biografico friulano 

280s deaths
3rd-century Christian martyrs
Saints from Roman Italy
Bishops of Aquileia
Year of birth unknown